Ousman Krubally (born March 13, 1988) is an American-Gambian professional basketball player for Keravnos of the Cypriot League. He is a 2.02 m (6' 7") tall power forward and small ball center. After playing four years of college basketball at Georgia State, Krubally entered the 2010 NBA draft, but he was not selected in the draft's two rounds.

High school
Krubally attended and played high school basketball at W. D. Mohammed High School, in Atlanta, Georgia.

College career
Krubally burst onto the scene at Georgia State, where he played college basketball under head coach, Michael Perry. He stayed at Georgia State until 2010, mostly playing as a bench player.

Professional career
After not being drafted in the 2010 NBA draft, Krubally signed with the London Leopards of the English Basketball League. Krubally finished the season averaging 22.1 points per game, the second highest in the Division. On July 15, 2011, he re-signed with the Leopards.

On November 21, 2012, he moved to Den Helder Kings of the Dutch League.

He next played with Grosuplje of the Slovenian Basketball League. Krubally had a terrific season, being the MVP of the league. He was also the league's top scorer and the top rebounder.

On July 27, 2014, he moved to Legnano Knights of the Italian 2nd Division Silver. He was the MVP of the regular season, averaging 19.2 points and 12 rebounds per game.

He joined the Greek League club Lavrio, in 2015. On May 2, 2016, Krubally moved to Umana Reyer Venezia of the Italian League for the rest of the season.

On July 25, 2016, Krubally joined the Kazakh VTB United League club Astana. He moved to the Greek club PAOK in 2017.

On August 8, 2018, Krubally signed a deal with the Italian LBA club Pistoia Basket 2000.

On July 17, 2019, he signed with ESSM Le Portel of the French LNB Pro A.

On July 22, 2020, he signed with New Basket Brindisi in the Italian Lega Basket Serie A and the Basketball Champions League. Krubally averaged 5.6 points and 4.5 rebounds per game. 

On August 14, 2021, he signed with Larisa of the Greek Basket League. In 35 league games, he averaged 10.4 points, 9 rebounds, 1.7 assists and 1.1 steals, playing around 29 minutes per contest.

Personal life
Krubally is engaged to Dutch basketball player Demelza ten Caat. They have two sons, Zayn and Omari.

Honours
Individual honors
Slovenian League MVP: (2014)
Slovenian League scoring leader: (2014)
Slovenian League efficiency leader: (2014)
Slovenian League rebounding leader: (2014)
Italian 2nd Division Silver MVP: (2015)

References

External links
Eurobasket.com Profile
Italian League Profile 
Greek Basket League Profile 
Greek Basket League Profile 
VTB United League Profile
Georgia State Panthers bio

1988 births
Living people
American expatriate basketball people in Greece
American expatriate basketball people in Italy
American expatriate basketball people in Kazakhstan
American expatriate basketball people in the Netherlands
American expatriate basketball people in Slovenia
American expatriate basketball people in the United Kingdom
American men's basketball players
American people of Gambian descent
Basketball players from Atlanta
BC Astana players
Centers (basketball)
Den Helder Kings players
Dutch Basketball League players
Essex Leopards players
ESSM Le Portel players
Gambian men's basketball players
Gambian expatriate basketball people in France
Georgia State Panthers men's basketball players
Keravnos B.C. players
KK Grosuplje players
Larisa B.C. players
Lavrio B.C. players
Lega Basket Serie A players
Legnano Basket Knights players
New Basket Brindisi players
P.A.O.K. BC players
Pistoia Basket 2000 players
Power forwards (basketball)
Reyer Venezia players